Véronique Riotton (born 2 November 1969) is a French politician of La République En Marche! (LREM) who has been serving as a member of the French National Assembly since the 2017 elections, representing the department of Haute-Savoie.

Political career
In parliament, Riotton serves on the Sustainable Development, Spatial and Regional Planning Committee, which she briefly chaired in 2020. In addition to her committee assignments, she is a member of the French-Nepalese Parliamentary Friendship Group and the French delegation to the Inter-Parliamentary Union (IPU).

From 2018 until 2019, Riotton was one of five deputy chairpersons of the LREM parliamentary group, under the leadership of chairman Gilles Le Gendre.

Political positions
In July 2019, Riotton voted in favour of the French ratification of the European Union’s Comprehensive Economic and Trade Agreement (CETA) with Canada.

See also
 2017 French legislative election

References

1969 births
Living people
Deputies of the 15th National Assembly of the French Fifth Republic
La République En Marche! politicians
21st-century French women politicians
Place of birth missing (living people)
Women members of the National Assembly (France)
Deputies of the 16th National Assembly of the French Fifth Republic